The International Go Federation (IGF) is an international organization that connects the various national Go federations around the world.

Role
The role of the IGF is to promote the sport of Go throughout the world, promote amicable relations among members and improve world go organization.  It does so by carrying out the following activities:
 Organizing the World Amateur Go Championship and other international Go tournaments;
 Publishing and distributing to members up-to-date information on world Go activities, through bulletins or on the IGF website;
 Other activities pertaining to the international development of Go.

Policies
The IGF is an apolitical and non-religious organization, and strives to promote fair play amongst all players.

History
The Japan Go Association organized the first World Go Amateur Championship in Japan, in 1979.  Many of the top Go players from around the world and representatives from the major National Go Associations attended the event. Its success led to the founding of the International Go Federation on March 18, 1982, with Shizuo Asada presiding over the original 29 founding members.

On April 7, 2006, the IGF became a member of the General Association of International Sports Federations (GAISF).

The IGF is one of the founding member of the IMSA (International Mind Sports Association).

The IGF organizes the yearly World Amateur Go Championship, which attracts over 65 countries.

Tournaments

 List of professional Go tournaments
 World Amateur Go Championship
 International Amateur Pair Go Championship
 International Amateur Baduk Championship
 European Go Championship
 European Pair Go Championship
 Asian Go Championship
 Pan American Go Championship
 Ibero American Go Championship

Members

 the IGF has 77 member nations: 39 in Europe, 18 in Asia, 15 in the Americas, 3 in Africa and 2 in Oceania. It also has five Association Members, which cover multiple countries: the World Pair Go Association, the Federación Iberoamericana de Go, the European Go Federation, the Ing Changk Wei-Chi Education Foundation and the Asian Go Federation.

IGF Presidents
Shizuo Asada, Professional Go Player and founding President of the IGF, 1982–1997
Fumio Watanabe, 1997–2001
Matsuo Toshimitsu, 2001–2004
Masao Kato, Professional 9-dan Go player, 2004–2005 (unfortunately was taken ill and died at the End of 2004)
Norio Kudo, Professional 9-dan Go player, 2005–2007
Hiromu Okabe, Chairman of the Board of Directors for the Nihon Ki-in, President of the Denso Corporation, 2007–2009
Otake Hideo, Chairman of the Board of Directors for the Nihon Ki-in, 2009–2010
Chang Zhenming, Vice-chairman and President of CITIC Group, 2010–2012
Koichiro Matsuura, President of World Pair Go Association and former Director General of UNESCO, 2012-2014
Seokhyun Hong, Chairman of the Korea Baduk Association, President of the Joongang Media Network, 2014-2016
Chang Zhenming, President of CITIC Group, June 4, 2016 – present

See also

 List of international sport federations

References

External links

Go organizations
Organizations based in Tokyo
Sports organizations established in 1982
International sports organizations